Negotinthia is a genus of moths in the family Sesiidae.

Species
Negotinthia hoplisiformis (Mann, 1864)
Negotinthia myrmosaeformis (Herrich-Schäffer, 1846)
Negotinthia myrmosaeformis myrmosaeformis (Herrich-Schäffer, 1846)
Negotinthia myrmosaeformis cingulata (Staudinger, 1871)

References

Sesiidae